Partido Revolucionário do Proletariado - Brigadas Revolucionárias (in English: Revolutionary Party of the Proletariat – Revolutionary Brigades) was a political organization in Portugal. The Revolutionary Brigades were founded in 1970 by Isabel do Carmo, Carlos Antunes and Pedro Goulart, and advocated armed struggle against the regime. The first armed action was carried out in 1971. PRP-BR was constructed as a party later. In 1975 the PRP attempted to create a School of Proletarian Culture as an alternative to bourgeois education. The PRP supported the candidacy for the 1976 presidential elections of Otelo Saraiva de Carvalho. After November 25, 1975, PRP and Revolutionary Brigades were formally separated. PRP-BR did not participate in elections after the advent of democracy in Portugal.

See also
 Popular Forces 25 April

References

Communism in Portugal
Defunct communist militant groups
Defunct communist parties in Portugal
Paramilitary organisations based in Portugal
Banned communist parties